The Lake Rukwa minnow (Raiamas moorii) is a species of ray-finned fish in the family Cyprinidae.
It is found in Lake Tanganyika, Lake Kivu and Lake Rukwa in Tanzania, the Democratic Republic of the Congo, Rwanda, Tanzania and Zambia.
Its natural habitats are rivers, freshwater lakes, freshwater marshes, and inland deltas.

References

Lake Rukwa minnow
Freshwater fish of Africa
Fish of Lake Rukwa
Fish of Lake Tanganyika
Lake Rukwa minnow
Taxonomy articles created by Polbot